"You Don't Know" is the lead single from the Shady compilation album Eminem Presents: The Re-Up. The song is performed by Eminem featuring artists 50 Cent, and Lloyd Banks, and features the new vocals from Cashis.

Critical reception
AllMusic called this song "the excellent all-star single "You Don't Know" plus highlight by same critic. B. Love was positive: "When Em snatches the mic and takes the lead on songs like the title track, "You Don't Know" (which everyone just rips), he makes a strong case for his claim to be the tightest emcee in the game" and he added: "Em isn't the only one sounding hungry again; Fif is sounding better than he has since his debut. (...) Its batting lead off on the aforementioned posse cut "You Don't Know."  RapReviews noted that 2 new rappers Bobby Creekwater and Cashis can be heard in following lyrics: ""Pistol play ricochet, see where the victim lay
Slumped over bleeding J.F.K.
A.K. 'til your chest plate cave
I'll ride to the death, do you rep that way?
Forever I'ma be a Shady 7-4 gangsta,
Plus I'll survive everything you got in that chamber
I thrive off of danger, jumpin in all beef
You keep talking shit now the squad called me"

The Guardian thought that Eminem lost creativity but the song was praised: "Eminem's production is barely more inspiring than his talent-spotting. He's been working from the same murky sonic palette since The Marshall Mathers LP: portentous gothic dirges thick with grumbling strings and minor-chord synthesizers. That formula is fiercely potent on You Don't Know, leavened by 50 Cent's sing-song chorus..." Stylus Magazine was negative: "Or as he (EM) puts it: "Hands on my head / Touch knees to elbows / I’m hunched over, emotionless / Flow’s over / These cold shoulders are both frozen / You don’t know me." Save it for Oprah."

Music video
The video appeared on MTV's Sucker Free, and BET's 106 & Park as a "New Joint", on November 7, 2006. The video reached number 1 on MTV's Total Request Live. Tony Yayo, The Alchemist, Young Buck, D12, Bobby Creekwater, Obie Trice, Mobb Deep, Trick Trick, Dr. Dre & Stat Quo all have cameo appearances. Obie Trice appeared as a helicopter coordinator carrying Lloyd Banks. The video is prison themed with each of the four featured artists portraying highly dangerous criminals. All four are wearing prison outfits and are significantly covered in chains and cuffs, and all four are transported in separate vehicles to a heavily guarded arena. 50 Cent is transported in maximum security prison plane (Boeing C17), Cashis in a train, Lloyd Banks in a helicopter and Eminem is transported in a heavy security transfer truck. The video seems to reference movies such as The Silence of the Lambs with Eminem being restrained in a similar trolley and muzzle to that of Hannibal Lecter's. Eminem also imitates Hannibal Lecter's trademark lip-licking motion to Jodie Foster when, in the beginning of the video, Eminem is visited at his cell by an FBI Agent who looks similar to Foster's character in The Silence of the Lambs. Also, the video references the action film Con Air when Eminem and his fellow prisoners are transported by airplane. This video is also notable for featuring Obie Trice wearing a prototype of Beats by Dr. Dre headphones two years before they were released.

The song has over 420 million views on YouTube.

Chart positions
"You Don't Know" was released in the UK on December 11, 2006. It managed to chart from download sales alone, peaking at #32. The song peaked at #12 on the Billboard Hot 100, becoming the highest debut for a single on this chart for 50 Cent, Lloyd Banks, and Cashis. It was Eminem's fifth highest debut, after "We Made You", at number 9, "Forever", with Drake, Kanye West, and Lil Wayne, at number 8, "Love the Way You Lie", with Rihanna, at number 2, and "Not Afraid", which became the sixteenth overall and second rap song to debut at number 1.  The song is featured in the WWE film The Condemned. This song is also used by the Boston Celtics for their player introductions at the TD Garden.

Track listing

Notes
 signifies an additional producer.

Charts

Certifications

References

External links

2006 singles
Eminem songs
50 Cent songs
Lloyd Banks songs
Songs written by Eminem
Songs written by 50 Cent
Song recordings produced by Eminem
Shady Records singles
Songs written by Luis Resto (musician)
Gangsta rap songs
Hardcore hip hop songs
Posse cuts